Chahdortt Djavann (born 1967) is an Iranian-born French contemporary writer, novelist, and essayist. Her works often touch on topics such as identity and memory; and she is outspoken against Islam and Iranian religious leaders. She regularly appears on French television and radio.

Biography 
Chahdortt Djavann was born in 1967 in Pahlavi Iran; her family was of Azerbaijani descent from an aristocratic line. She left Iran in 1991. First, she moved to Turkey, followed by a move to France in 1993. She attended the School for Advanced Studies in the Social Sciences (French: Ecole des Hautes Etudes en Sciences Sociales) in Paris.

Her novel La Muette (Flammarion, 2008) is the confession of a fifteen-year-old girl sentenced to hang in the prisons of the Islamic Republic of Iran.  

Djavann often was on the forefront of political and religious debates, including the veil debates in France, and she has spoken openly on the topic of immigration assimilation. In January 2006, Djavann was a guest on the French television program Culture et Dépendances, where she spoke on "assimilation as liberation".

She was awarded the Grand Prix de la Laïcité (2003) for secularism from the  association. In 2004, she was honored with the title of Chevalier (Knight) of the Ordre des Arts et des Lettres. 

Her work has sparked both praise and criticism. Djavann was labeled as a experiencing "self-orientalism" by Laetitia Nanquette in the research article French New Orientalist Narratives from the "Natives": Reading More Than Chahdortt Djavann in Paris (2009), published in the academic journal Comparative Studies of South Asia, Africa and the Middle East.

Publications

See also

References

External links 

 Chahdortt Djavann's podcasts at Radio France
 Chahdortt Djavann IMDb

1967 births
Iranian emigrants to France
Iranian writers
French writers
Writers from Paris
School for Advanced Studies in the Social Sciences alumni
Iranian Azerbaijanis
Secularism in France
French women novelists
Iranian women novelists
Living people